Mount Avalon is a  mountain located in Grafton County, New Hampshire, United States. It is a small, rocky spur of Mount Field, overlooking Crawford Notch in the White Mountains. Avalon's summit is reached by a spur from the Mount Avalon Trail, which climbs to the summit of Mount Field.

The slopes of Mount Avalon drain to Crawford Brook, which flows north from Crawford Notch to the Ammonoosuc River, part of the Connecticut River watershed.

See also

 List of mountains of New Hampshire
 White Mountain National Forest

References

External links
 
 "Mt. Avalon Hiking Guide". FranklinSites.com.

Mountains of New Hampshire
Mountains of Grafton County, New Hampshire